Empire is an unincorporated community in Butler County, in the U.S. state of Missouri.

The community took its name from the Empire Lumber Company.

References

Unincorporated communities in Butler County, Missouri
Unincorporated communities in Missouri